Adam Michael Blythe (born 1 October 1989) is an English former professional road and track racing cyclist, who competed professionally between 2010 and 2019 for the , , , ,  and  teams. Blythe began racing at a young age and went on to become a member of British Cycling's Olympic Development Programme.

Amateur career
Born in Sheffield, Blythe began cycling at a young age with the Sheffield Phoenix club. Cycling was a family activity, his sister Kimberley Blythe was also fairly successful as a young rider.

Blythe became Derbyshire's Junior Sportsman of the Year in the East Midlands Sports Personality of the Year Awards, 2005.

Blythe left British Cycling's Academy Programme by mutual consent in February 2008, and went to race in Belgium. He stayed with the ex-professional cyclist, Tim Harris, in Westmeerbeek, near Antwerp. Blythe was awarded a Cycling Time Trials scholarship to enable him to race on the continent and develop further. He raced for the Wielerclub Des Sprinters Malderen which is a feeder club for a professional team. He also received support from the Dave Rayner Fund during his time in Belgium.

Professional career
Blythe returned to Belgium to ride for the DAVO squad in 2009, under the tutelage of Kurt Van De Wouwer, a former professional. He had joined pro-tour team  as a trainee in July 2009, it was announced on 7 September 2009 that he had signed a two-year contract with Silence-Lotto in the wake of a string of good results for the team.

In 2014, Blythe rode for the newly formed British  team. After a very successful year competing on the British domestic scene, Blythe joined Australian team  for the 2015 season.

With  folding at the end of 2016, Blythe joined the  squad for its inaugural season in 2017.

In October 2019, Blythe announced that he would retire at the end of the season.

Post-racing career
Blythe is a pundit for Eurosport's coverage of cycling, having worked part-time in this role on the channel's coverage of the Grand Tours during his final professional season in 2019. He was also "on-site" reporter for NBC Sports' coverage of the 2020 Tour de France, and fulfilled that role again in 2021.

In November 2019, Blythe announced that he was taking up a role with David Millar's cycling clothing brand CHPT3 as a product marketing executive.

Personal life
He currently lives in Bollington, Cheshire, England.

Major results

Road

2006
 3rd National Criterium Championships
2007
 1st  Overall Driedaagse van Axel
1st Sprints classification
1st Points classification
1st Combination classification
1st Stages 1 & 4
 1st Kuurne–Brussels–Kuurne Juniores
 6th Paris–Roubaix Juniors
2008
 Tour of Hong Kong Shanghai
1st Stages 2 & 3b
2009
 1st Circuit du Port de Dunkerque
 1st Stage 7 Thüringen Rundfahrt der U23
 2nd Grote 1-MeiPrijs
 5th Antwerpse Havenpijl
2010
 1st  Overall Circuit Franco-Belge
1st  Points classification
1st  Young rider classification
1st Stages 1 & 3
 1st Nationale Sluitingsprijs
 3rd Omloop van het Houtland
 4th Grand Prix de Fourmies
 4th Schaal Sels
2011
 2nd Houtem–Vilvoorde
 3rd Grote Prijs Stad Zottegem
 4th Overall Ronde van Drenthe
1st  Young rider classification
 7th Overall Tour de Wallonie-Picarde
2012
 1st Binche–Tournai–Binche
 1st Stage 1 Paris–Corrèze
 2nd Omloop van het Houtland
 3rd Handzame Classic
 4th Grand Prix d'Isbergues
 10th Overall Tour of Qatar
2013
 4th Overall Tour of Qatar
1st Stage 2 (TTT)
2014
 1st  National Criterium Championships
 1st RideLondon–Surrey Classic
 1st Otley Grand Prix
 1st Ipswich and Coastal Grand Prix
 1st Circuit of the Fens
 1st Jersey International Road Race
 2nd Beverley Grand Prix
 3rd Beaumont Trophy
 6th Rutland–Melton International CiCLE Classic
2015
 2nd Stafford GP
 3rd Overall Tour de Korea
2016
 1st  Road race, National Championships
2017
 2nd Nokere Koerse
 2nd Handzame Classic
 4th Ronde van Drenthe
2018
 1st Elfstedenronde
 2nd Road race, National Championships
 5th Handzame Classic
 7th Ronde van Limburg
 9th Three Days of Bruges–De Panne

Grand Tour general classification results timeline

Track

2006
 1st  Team pursuit, UEC European Junior Championships
 National Junior Championships
1st  Scratch
2nd Points race
 2nd Madison (with Matthew Rowe), National Championships
2007
 1st  Team pursuit, UEC European Junior Championships
 1st  Madison (with Luke Rowe), National Championships
 1st UIV Cup, Six Days of Ghent (with Peter Kennaugh)
 National Junior Championships
2nd Scratch
3rd Points race
2013
 2nd Madison (with Peter Kennaugh), National Championships
2014
 2nd Team pursuit, National Championships

References

External links
 
 
 
 

1989 births
Living people
British male cyclists
English male cyclists
Commonwealth Games competitors for England
Cyclists at the 2018 Commonwealth Games
Sportspeople from Sheffield
Cyclists from Yorkshire
British cycling road race champions
British expatriates in Monaco
Cycling announcers